The Investec Royal Swazi Open is a golf tournament on the Sunshine Tour. It was first played in 1971 and is played at the Royal Swazi Spa Country Club in the Ezulwini Valley, Eswatini. Since 2003, it has been played using a Modified Stableford System.

Winners

References

External links
Sunshine Tour's official site

Sunshine Tour events
Golf tournaments in Eswatini
Recurring sporting events established in 1971
1971 establishments in Swaziland